April Fool is a 1964 Indian romantic comedy film written, produced and directed by Subodh Mukherji. It stars Biswajeet and Saira Banu in pivotal roles.

Plot 
Ashok comes from a wealthy family, headed by his father, and elder brother, Alok. Ashok is a slacker, and enjoys playing practical jokes, particularly on his favorite day: April Fools' Day, when he outdoes himself. His jokes help him befriend Madhu, and both fall in love. When one of is pranks go awry both Ashok and Madhu become targets of an international gang, and must run for their own safety, as well as for the safety of their respective families.

Cast 
 Biswajeet as Ashok
 Saira Banu as Madhu / Rita Christina
 Jayant as Mr. Lal
 Sajjan as Monto
 Nazima as Anu
 Shivraj as Ashok's Uncle
 Ram Avtar as Hotel Manager
 Ruby Mayer as Rita's Mother
 Rajan Haskar as Rasik (as Rajen Haksar)
 Chand Usmani as Mrs. Brijlal Sinha
 M.B. Shetty as Shetty
 Vinod (cameo appearance)
 Pradeep Gupta (cameo appearance)
 Ratan Gaurang as Gaurang
 Dev Kapal (cameo appearance)

Soundtrack 
The music of the film was composed by Shankar–Jaikishan and lyrics by Hasrat Jaipuri.

See also 
 List of Bollywood films of 1964

References

External links 
 

1960s Hindi-language films
1964 films
1964 romantic comedy films
Indian romantic comedy films
Films scored by Shankar–Jaikishan